The Former Residence of Cai Yuanpei or Cai Yuanpei's Former Residence is the birthplace of Cai Yuanpei, a Chinese educator, esperantist, president of Peking University, and founder of the Academia Sinica.

History
The former residence was originally built by Cai Jiamo, the grandfather of Cai Yuanpei, in the reign of Daoguang Emperor (1821–1850) in the Qing dynasty (1644–1911).

On 11 January 1868, Cai Yuanpei was born here.

On 25 June 2011, it was listed among the fifth group of "State Cultural Protection Relics Units" by the State Council of China.

Architecture

Gallery

References

Major National Historical and Cultural Sites in Zhejiang
Traditional folk houses in Zhejiang
Buildings and structures in Shaoxing
Tourist attractions in Shaoxing